XHMT-FM is a radio station on 98.5 FM in Mérida, Yucatán, Mexico. It is owned by Grupo SIPSE and is known as La Comadre with a grupera format.

History
XHMT received its concession on January 16, 1980. It was owned by Ricardo López Méndez until its sale to ACIR in the 1990s. In 2013, ACIR sold its two stations in Mérida to SIPSE, which continued to operate them with similar formats with identical names.

References

Radio stations in Yucatán
Radio stations established in 1980